Tim Breithaupt (born 7 February 2002) is a German professional footballer who plays as a defensive midfielder for Karlsruher SC.

Career
Breithaupt began his youth career at hometown club SV Nesselried, and later played for the youth team of Offenburger FV. He then joined SC Freiburg, beginning with the under-13 team, before moving to the youth academy of Karlsruher SC in 2017. Breithaupt made his professional debut for Karlsruhe's senior team in the 2. Bundesliga on 2 January 2021, coming on as a substitute in the 86th minute for Jérôme Gondorf against Würzburger Kickers. The away match finished as a 4–2 win for Karlsruhe.

References

External links
 
 
 

2002 births
Living people
People from Offenburg
Sportspeople from Freiburg (region)
Footballers from Baden-Württemberg
German footballers
Association football midfielders
Karlsruher SC players
2. Bundesliga players